Sandpoint Airport  is a county-owned public-use airport in the northwest United States, located two nautical miles (4 km) north of the central business district of Sandpoint in Bonner County, Idaho. The airport is also known as Dave Wall Field.

Although most U.S. airports use the same three-letter location identifier for the FAA and IATA, this airport is assigned SZT by the FAA but has no designation from the IATA (which assigned SZT to San Cristóbal de las Casas National Airport in Mexico).

Facilities and aircraft 
It has one asphalt paved runway designated 2/20 which measures .

For the 12-month period ending April 28, 2006, the airport had 29,900 aircraft operations, an average of 81 per day: 99% general aviation and 1% air taxi. At that time there were 85 aircraft based at this airport: 84% single-engine, 13% multi-engine, 2% helicopter and 1% jet.

References

External links 
 Sandpoint Airport page at Idaho Transportation Department
 

Airports in Idaho
Buildings and structures in Bonner County, Idaho
Transportation in Bonner County, Idaho